The Social Pirates is a 1916 American silent film serial directed by James W. Horne. It starred Marin Sais, Ollie Kirkby and True Boardman. It was written by George Bronson Howard and produced by the Kalem Company.

Cast
Marin Sais as Mona Hartley
Ollie Kirkby as Mary Davenport
True Boardman as 
Frank Jonasson as King of the Nile
Paul Hurst as Mona's Accomplice
Jessie Arnold 
Thomas G. Lingham as James Harrasford
Edward Clisbee 
Priscilla Dean 
Robert N. Bradbury 
Forrest Taylor 
Rupert Dell 
Barney Furey 
Ruth Snyder

Chapter titles
 The Little Monte Carlo
 The Corsican Sisters
 The Parasite
 A War of Wits
 The Millionaire Plunger
 The Master Swindlers
 The Rogue's Nemesis
 Sauce for the Gander
 The Missing Millionaire
 Unmasking a Rascal
 The Fangs of the Tattler
 The Disappearance of Helen Mintern
 In the Service of the State
 The Music Swindlers
 Black Magic

References

External links

1916 films
American silent serial films
Films directed by James W. Horne
American black-and-white films
Kalem Company films
American action adventure films
1910s action adventure films
1910s American films
Silent adventure films